The Exchange Bank Building (also known as the Midyette-Moor Building) is a historic bank building in Tallahassee, Florida. It is located at 201 South Monroe Street and was designed by architect William Augustus Edwards. It was added to the National Register of Historic Places in 1984.

References

External links

 Leon County listings at National Register of Historic Places
 Florida's Office of Cultural and Historical Programs
 Leon County listings
 Exchange Bank Building

Historic buildings and structures in Leon County, Florida
National Register of Historic Places in Tallahassee, Florida
Buildings and structures in Tallahassee, Florida
William Augustus Edwards buildings
History of Tallahassee, Florida
Bank buildings on the National Register of Historic Places in Florida